Jay Leland Benedict  (April 14, 1882 – September 16, 1953) was a United States Army major general and superintendent of the United States Military Academy (1938–1940).

Career

Benedict received an appointment to West Point as a member of the class of 1904. He was commissioned as a field artillery officer and served on several staffs, serving as a 2nd lieutenant in the Secret Service Agent (1908) and graduating from the Army War College in 1926. After serving as executive officer for the 16th Infantry Regiment (United States) at Fort Jay, New York, he commanded the 12th Infantry Regiment (United States) at Fort Howard, Maryland in 1936. Positions held included: Army major general and superintendent (from 1938 to 1940). He served on the War Department General Staff during World War II. Legion Of Merit Award For As Procurement And Discharge Section In G- (between 1942 and 1946).

Decorations

Personal life
Benedict was born in Hastings, Nebraska,  In 1907 he married Genevieve Ardell Goldstein and in 1924 married Loretta Katherine Maher. He died in Arlington, Virginia at the age of 71 and was buried in Section 2 Site 4961-A,arlington National Cemetery, Virginia.

References

External links
Army Offices 1939-1945

1882 births
1953 deaths
United States Army Field Artillery Branch personnel
United States Military Academy alumni
Superintendents of the United States Military Academy
Burials at Arlington National Cemetery
People from Hastings, Nebraska
United States Army War College alumni
Recipients of the Distinguished Service Medal (US Army)
Recipients of the Legion of Merit
United States Army personnel of World War I
United States Army generals of World War II
United States Army generals
20th-century American academics